Hafen or Häfen may refer to the following topics:

Places
Düsseldorf-Hafen, a district of Düsseldorf, Germany
Hafen (Osnabrück), a district of Osnabrück, Germany

People
Bruce C. Hafen (born 1940), American attorney
John Hafen (1856–1910), American artist
LeRoy Reuben Hafen (1893–1985), American historian

Other
Hafen Slawkenbergius, a fictional character in Laurence Sterne's Tristram Shandy 
Eisenbahn und Häfen GmbH, a German rail company